The Artium Museum is a contemporary art museum located in Vitoria-Gasteiz, the capital of the province of Álava in northern Spain. Designed by the architect  José Luis Caton, it is owned by the Provincial Council of Álava and opened 26 April 2002 and its director is Daniel Castillejo. The Museum was a created by the initiative of the Provincial Council of Alava, which is the owner of most of the works that are in the museum, and it's the owner of the building too. The aim of this museum is to develop the critical view of the society and to make Alava be associated with art and culture.

The Museum has three tools: firstly, there's the collection of contemporary art, secondly, the temporary exhibitions and finally an intensive programme of educational and cultural activities, in which there's the option of groups of schools to go to the museum as an educational activity.

The museum holds works by numerous artists, including Miquel Barceló, Joseph Beuys, Joan Brossa, Juan Francisco Casas, Jake and Dinos Chapman, Eduardo Chillida, Salvador Dalí, Óscar Domínguez, Manolo Millares, Joan Miró, Juan Muñoz, Jorge Oteiza, Pablo Palazuelo, Pablo Picasso, Antonio Saura, Antoni Tàpies, Juan Uslé, and Darío Villalba. It also includes a library and documentation center, both of which are open to the public.

The Artium is one of the symbols of Vitoria-Gasteiz and it represents one of the fundamental assets of the art scene in Spain.

Building

The building is located in the centre of Vitoria-Gasteiz, exactly on the Francia Street. It  stands on a trapezoidal, almost rectangular square and there is a main lobby, the Auditorium, the Plaza Room, the Cube Restaurant, ticket office and cloakroom, among others.

Gallery

See also

 Basque Country (autonomous community)

References

Modern art museums in Spain
Buildings and structures in Álava
Art museums established in 2002
Vitoria-Gasteiz
2002 establishments in Spain
Museums in the Basque Country (autonomous community)
Tourist attractions in Álava